Thélus Léro (22 February 1909 in Lamentin, Martinique – 22 July 1996 in Fort-de-France) was a communist politician from Martinique who was elected to the French Senate in 1946. Léro married the writer and artist, Yva de Montaigne, with whom he had three children. One of their daughters was the actress Cathy Rosier.

References 
 
Thélus Léro page on the French Senate website

1909 births
1996 deaths
People from Le Lamentin
French Communist Party politicians
French Senators of the Fourth Republic
French people of Martiniquais descent
Senators of Martinique